C-C chemokine receptor type 10 is a protein that in humans is encoded by the CCR10 gene.

Function 

Chemokines are a group of small (approximately 8 to 14 kD), mostly basic, structurally related molecules that regulate cell trafficking of various types of leukocytes through interactions with a subset of 7-transmembrane, G protein-coupled receptors. Chemokines also play fundamental roles in the development, homeostasis, and function of the immune system, and they have effects on cells of the central nervous system as well as on endothelial cells involved in angiogenesis or angiostasis. Chemokines are divided into 2 major subfamilies, CXC and CC, based on the arrangement of the first 2 of the 4 conserved cysteine residues; the 2 cysteines are separated by a single amino acid in CXC chemokines and are adjacent in CC chemokines.

CCR10 is a chemokine receptor. Its ligands are CCL27 and CCL28. This receptor is normally expressed by melanocytes, plasma cells and skin-homing T cells. B16 melanoma cell transduction of CCR10 significantly increases the development of lymph node metastasis in mice after inoculation in the skin, suggesting a role for the receptor in directing metastasis. CCR10-CCL27 interactions are involved in T cell-mediated skin inflammation.

References

Further reading

External links
 

Chemokine receptors